Manuel Martín Piñera (born 3 June 1931) is a Spanish former professional cyclist. He most notably won 5 stages of the Vuelta a España, among many other professional wins.

Biography
Manuel Martín was born in Cabezón de la Sal, Cantabri on June 3, 1931. After retiring in 1970, a friend offered him a job at a company where he stayed until retirement.

Career
Martín as professional from 1955 to 1969, where he notably won five stages of the Vuelta a España. Height 1.72 and weight in form 68-70 kg. He was considered a rouleur with great physical strength. He started his career late, at the age of 24 in the beginners category. In 1968, at 38 years old, Lagaríca signed with Karpy, and won 2 stages in the Vuelta España in which he was also a team leader. He retired after the following season.

Major results

1958
 1st  Overall Vuelta a La Rioja
1st Stage 2
1960
 1st  Overall Circuito Montañés
 1st GP Cuprosan
1961
1st Stage 12 Vuelta a Colombia
1962
 2nd Overall Volta a Catalunya
 3rd Road race, National Road Championships
1963
 1st Circuito de Getxo
 3rd Klasika Primavera
1964
 1st GP Ayuntamiento de Bilbao
 3rd Trofeo Jaumendreu
1965
 1st Stages 6 & 18 Vuelta a España
 1st Orense
1966
 1st Trofeo Masferrer
 2nd Overall Vuelta a los Valles Mineros
 3rd Campeonato Vasco Navarro de Montaña
1968
 1st Stages 8 & 18 Vuelta a España
1969
 1st Stage 10 Vuelta a España

Grand Tour results

Tour de France
 1963: DNF
 1964: 52

Vuelta a España
 1959: 35
 1960: DNF
 1961: 45
 1962: 47
 1963: 30
 1965: 21
 1966: 49
 1968: 40
 1969: 67

Giro d'Italia
 1967: 50

References

External links
 

1931 births
Living people
Spanish male cyclists
Spanish Vuelta a España stage winners
Cyclists from Cantabria
People from the Saja and Nansa Valleys